Bipolar Integrated Technology, Inc. (BIT), later Bit, Inc., was a privately held semiconductor company based in Beaverton, Oregon, which sold products implemented  with emitter-coupled logic technology.  The company was founded in 1983 by former Floating Point Systems, Intel, and Tektronix engineers. The company, which occupied a 46,000-square-foot manufacturing facility manufacturing facility at the Oregon Graduate Center, raised $36 million in start-up capital within three years of its foundation.

The initial product was a floating-point co-processor chipset. Later, the company produced the B5000 SPARC ECL microprocessor (never reached production in a Sun Microsystems product, though used by Floating Point Systems). They also produced the R6000 MIPS ECL microprocessor, which did reach production as a MIPS minicomputer. Initial yields of the R6000 were very poor, leading to parts shortages for MIPS Computer Systems; the latter company attributed their first quarterly loss in October 1990 to BIT. The two signed an agreement in June 1991 to allow BIT to market the R6000 on the open market, dissolving the previous exclusivity agreement with MIPS.

Under its new president Fred Hanson, BIT had its first profitable year in 1991, reaching peak revenues of $20 million. Revenues dropped the following year to about $10 million, however, after it had lost four of its largest customers, including MIPS, Floating Point, and Control Data. The company eventually entered the telecommunications market with Asynchronous Transfer Mode (ATM) devices and Ethernet switches. The company was eventually acquired by PMC-Sierra in September 1996 for these later communications products.

References

External links

1983 establishments in Oregon
1996 disestablishments in Oregon
American companies established in 1983
American companies disestablished in 1996
Beaverton, Oregon
Computer companies established in 1983
Computer companies disestablished in 1996
Defunct companies based in Oregon
Defunct computer companies of the United States
Defunct computer hardware companies
Defunct semiconductor companies of the United States